In card games, to cut the cards (also "cut the deck" or "cut the pack") is to split the deck into two packets by lifting one packet from the top and placing it face down beside the remainder; before placing the lower packet on top of it. This is typically done after the cards have already been shuffled, and the procedure is used just prior to the cards being dealt to the players. The aim of this is to reduce the possibility of cheating, for example, by knowing the bottom card. Cutting the cards is also a common way of determining the seating order at a card table, the partnerships or the first dealer.

Purpose 
The practice of cutting is primarily a method of reducing the likelihood of someone cheating by manipulating the order of cards to gain advantage. Even if the dealer (or the shuffler, if he is not the dealer) does not plan on cheating, cutting will prevent suspicions, thus many rules require it. Some players also consider the cut to be lucky. Parlett says the purpose of cutting is to prevent the bottom card from being known.

A secondary purpose is simply as a form of drawing lots whereby all the players cut the pack before the game starts to determine such things as seating, partnerships and first dealer.

History 
According to David Parlett, until the 20th century it was usual for the player cutting the lowest card to deal first. Moreover, for the purpose of cutting only and thus regardless of their ranking in the game, cards ranked in what was then their natural order i.e., with Aces low, as follows: Joker–A–2–3–4–5–6–7–8–9–10–J–Q–K.

Procedure 
A common procedure is that after the cards have been shuffled, the dealer sets the cards face-down on the table near the player designated to make the cut. This is usually the player to the dealer's right in clockwise games and the player to his left in anticlockwise games. The cutter initiates a cut of the deck by taking a contiguous range of cards off the top of the deck and placing it face-down on the table farther from the dealer; the dealer completes the cut by taking the original bottom portion of the deck and placing it on top of the just-moved cards.  Another common procedure is that the person making the cut, places the top part of the cut closer to the dealer, as the deck originally was placed nearer to the cutter. Once the cut is complete, the dealer picks up the deck, straightens or "squares" it, and deals the cards.

Rules of procedure or etiquette may vary concerning who makes the cut, the minimum or maximum number of cards which may be cut off the top, whether the dealer or the cutter restacks the cards, whether a cut card is employed, and whether a cut is mandatory.

In some games the cutter may choose not to cut; typically by knocking, i.e. tapping the top of the pack or the table with the fist. In some games, the dealer may then deal the entire hand to each player, rather than individually or in packets. In other games, the cutter may then specify how the dealer is to distribute the cards.

Etiquette 
During informal card games, the dealer is typically not required to offer the cut, and even if offered, the designated player can decline the request. On the other hand, any player may specifically request to cut the cards before they are dealt. If a cut is requested by a player, it must be granted by the dealer.

In formal player dealt settings, such as in a casino or during a tournament, an offer to cut the deck is mandatory and the designated player must perform the cut, generally by inserting a cut card (a plastic card about the size of a playing card, usually solid-colored) into the deck; the dealer then makes the actual cut at that point in the deck. When the dealer is not a player (i.e. a casino employee), the cut is mandatory and is usually performed by the dealer. In this instance, the deck is cut onto the aforementioned cut card, and the cut completed; this prevents players from seeing the bottom card of the deck.

The contiguous section may also be taken from the middle of the deck. This is called "Scarne's cut", though in some settings this is considered poor etiquette or against the rules. A cut involving a very small number of cards, such as taking only the top card, taking some cards from the bottom or taking every card bar the bottom one as a cut, is often acceptable according to rules. Other rules may specify that at least three cards must be taken or left in making a cut. Sometimes up to three cuts are allowed. A sensible minimum is about one-fifth of the deck.

A cut should always be completed with one hand to limit possibility of a false cut.

Drawing lots 
Cards may be cut as a form of drawing lots whereby all the players cut the pack before the game starts to determine such things as the seating order around the card table, the partnerships within the game and who deals first. Once again the cards are shuffled first, before each player cuts. Procedures vary and should be agreed beforehand. For example, to determine partnerships, players may agree in advance that those cutting the two highest cards play together, those cutting the two lowest cards forming the second team. The first dealer is usually the person drawing the highest or lowest-ranking card. An alternative to cutting is for the shuffled pack to be fanned, face down, on the table. Players then draw a card at random.

Types of cut

Scarne's cut 
Scarne's cut was developed by John Scarne during World War II to help protect servicemen against cheating by unscrupulous dealers. First one pulls out a portion of the middle of the stack and places it back on top of the deck; one then performs a regular cut described earlier.

Multiple cuts 
It can be demonstrated that multiple top-to-bottom (non-Scarne's) cuts are equivalent to some single cut.  In fact, knowing the size of the deck and the size of the cuts, the formula for the composite single cut is given as the sum of the sizes of the cuts modulo the size of the deck.  For example, in a 10 card deck, if a 7 card cut and a 4 card cut are made, that is, 7 cards are moved from the top of the deck to the bottom and then the resulting top 4 cards are also moved to the bottom, then those two consecutive cuts are equivalent to a cut the size of (7 + 4 = 11 (mod 10)) = 1.  The deck will be in the order (2,3,...,10,1).

False cut
A false cut is a move used either in magic, or for cheating when playing card games. It appears to be a real cut, but leaves the deck in the same order as when it began. More sophisticated versions may make specific desired changes to the deck's order, while still appearing to be an innocuous normal cut.

There are many ways to accomplish a false cut, involving misdirection or using complex moves to conceal the real result.

Other uses

Game 
Cutting cards is usually a prelude to a game, but it can be a game unto itself. Each player, in turn, removes a selection of cards from the top and reveals the bottom card to all the players, and then replaces the cards in the original position. Whoever has revealed the highest (or sometimes lowest) card is the winner. This is often used in an informal setting, much like flipping coins; it is also sometimes used to determine who will play first in a card game.

Joke 
The command to "cut the cards", followed by someone literally chopping the deck in half with an axe, is a none-too-subtle gag that has been used many times in popular media, going back to at least the vaudeville days. Examples include Harpo Marx in Horse Feathers, Curly Howard in Ants in the Pantry, and Bugs Bunny in Bugs Bunny Rides Again.

References

Card game terminology
Card shuffling